Zhejiang International Studies University  is located in the city of Hangzhou, Zhejiang Province. Zhejiang International Studies University (ZISU), situated near the West Lake, is run by Zhejiang Provincial Government.

Brief history
The main root of this university was founded in 1987 known as the Quishi Academy then it became formerly known as Zhejiang Education Institute, which was founded in 1955 and started enrolling full-time undergraduates in 1994, ZISU got its present name in 2010 with the authorization of the State Ministry of Education.

Fast Facts
City- Zhejiang—Hangzhou
Degree Programs- 32
Number of Students-5162
International Students- 356

School Campus
In Hangzhou, Zhejiang Province:
Urban
Wensan Campus, the headquarters
Suburban
Xiaoheshan Campus

Colleges and Departments
English Language and Culture 
European and Asian Languages and Culture 
Chinese Language and Culture 
International Business Administration 
Educational Science 
Science and Technology 
Arts 
Applied Foreign Languages
International Education 
Adult Education and Lifelong Learning
The Department of  Social Sciences 
The Department of Physical Education

Faculty

The full-time teachers total 333, including 69 professors and 110 associate professors, 81 of whom hold a Ph. D. Among them, one is the National Outstanding Teacher, seven the Provincial Outstanding Teachers, 21 the Provincial Outstanding Talents, and 11 the Provincial Young Academic Leaders. Moreover, ZISU currently employs 9 foreign experts and teachers.

International Exchange
Universiti Tunku Abdul Rahman
Washburn University
University of Central Arkansas
University of Wisconsin - River Falls UWRF UWRF ZISU Partnership
The Kyoto College of Graduate Studies for Informatics
Josai International University
Queensland University of Technology
Saint Francis Xavier University

References

External links
Study In China
School of International Studies

Zhejiang International Studies University
Hangzhou